The New York State Public High School Athletic Association (NYSPHSAA) is the governing body of interscholastic sports for most public schools in New York outside New York City.  The organization was created in 1923, after a predecessor organization called the New York State Public High School Association of Basketball Leagues began in 1921 to bring consistency to eligibility rules and to conduct state tournaments.  It consists of 768 member high schools from the state divided into 11 geographic sections. While as its name suggests the vast majority of its members are public, it does include a number of private and Catholic high schools. Most of these are located in Central New York and the Capital District, where parallel sanctioning bodies for private schools (like the MMAA in Western New York, the CHSAA in Metropolitan New York, or various leagues in and around New York City) do not exist. It is a member of the National Federation of State High School Associations as well as the New York State Federation of Secondary School Athletic Associations.

NYSPHSAA sports
The NYSPHSAA acknowledges 23 sports and holds over 30 championship events throughout 3 seasons: Fall, Winter and Spring.

Fall Sports

Boys Cross Country
Girls Cross Country
Field Hockey
Football
Boys Gymnastics (Regional)
Girls Gymnastics
Boys Soccer
Girls Soccer
Game Day Cheer
Girls Swimming and Diving
Girls Tennis
Boys Volleyball
Girls Volleyball

Winter Sports

Boys Basketball
Girls Basketball
Boys Bowling
Girls Bowling
Competitive Cheer
Boys Ice hockey
Boys Indoor Track and Field
Girls Indoor Track and Field
Rifle
Boys Nordic Skiing
Girls Nordic Skiing
Boys Alpine Skiing
Girls Alpine Skiing
Boys Swimming and Diving
Boys Volleyball (Regional)
Girls Volleyball (Regional)
Wrestling

Spring Sports

Baseball
Boys Golf
Girls Golf
Boys Lacrosse
Girls Lacrosse
Softball
Boys Tennis
Boys Outdoor Track and Field
Girls Outdoor Track and Field

Sections
The NYSPHSAA is divided into eleven sections by geographical areas. The official membership list is at the NYSPHSAA site.

Section 1: Dutchess, Putnam, Rockland, Westchester Counties
Section 2: Capital District
Section 3: Central New York
Section 4: Southern Tier
Section 5: Genesee Valley
Section 6: Western New York
Section 7: Champlain Area
Section 8: Nassau County
Section 9: Orange, Sullivan, Ulster Counties
Section 10: St. Lawrence and Franklin Counties
Section 11: Suffolk County

Each section is further divided into classes, by school enrollment size. The classes are, from largest schools to smallest, AA, A, B, C, and D, though the classifications and enrollment numbers for each classification vary by sport.

Typically, each section holds a sectional championship tournament in each sport and class. The sectional champions then meet first in regional competition, then in state competition, to determine the state champion in each class.

See also
New York State Public High School Athletic Association Boys Basketball Championships
Public Schools Athletic League
New York state high school boys basketball championships

References

External links
Official site

Organizations based in New York (state)
Sports organizations established in 1923
High school sports associations in the United States
Sports governing bodies in the United States
High school sports associations in New York (state)
1923 establishments in New York (state)